was a Palauan politician who served as the President of Palau from 1993 to 2001. He had earlier served as Vice President of Palau from 1989 to 1993, under Ngiratkel Etpison.

Background and early life
Nakamura was the son of a Japanese immigrant from Matsusaka, Ise Province and a Palauan chieftain's daughter. He was studying in his second year of primary school when the surrender of Japan ended World War II. He graduated from high school under the U.S. occupation of Palau and went on to study at the University of Hawaii.

Spouse
Elong Nakamura (born 2 May 1944 — 17 November 2018 in Palau) is the wife of President Kuniwo Nakamura. She died in Palau on 17 November 2018 at the age of 74.

Career
Nakamura began his political career at the age of 28, becoming the youngest person to be elected to the Congress of Micronesia. He served as Vice-President from January 1989 to January 1993. He was first elected president in the 1992 elections; he attracted 3,125 votes, versus 2,084 for one-term incumbent Ngiratkel Etpison and 3,188 for rival Johnson Toribiong, and then went on to defeat Toribiong in the runoff. He served two terms, being re-elected in 1996 by a 64%-36% margin over Ibedul Yutaka Gibbons. He did not run in the 2000 elections, but backed his vice-president Tommy Remengesau, who emerged victorious by a 53%-47% margin against senator Peter Sugiyama.

References

External links
Grassroots president mulls legacy

1943 births
2020 deaths
Presidents of Palau
Vice presidents of Palau
Justice Ministers of Palau
Foreign Ministers of Palau
Government ministers of Palau
Members of the Congress of the Trust Territory of the Pacific Islands
Palauan politicians of Japanese descent
University of Hawaiʻi at Mānoa alumni